The 12663 / 12664 Tiruchirappalli – Howrah Superfast Express is an inter-city Express service connecting Tiruchirappalli, Tamil Nadu with Howrah (Kolkata), West Bengal in India.

Overview
This express train was introduced during the 1998–1999 Railway Budget to run between Tiruchirappalli in Tamil Nadu and Howrah/Kolkata in West Bengal tri-weekly, leaving Tiruchi on Tuesdays, Fridays and Saturdays. Numbered as 6803/6804, the service was reduced to bi-weekly, leaving Tiruchi on Tuesdays and Fridays only, in July 2000. On Saturdays the service was extended till Kanyakumari as a new service numbered 6355/6356.

This train was converted to Superfast type and re-numbered to 2663/2664 from 24 January 2006 (Tiruchi) and 26 January 2006 (Howrah). The train number was changed to 12663/12664 from December 2010 as a part of train management system over the entire Indian Railways network. The train runs with LHB rakes from August 2022.

Rakes
The train has 24 coaches comprising 1 AC First Class Cum AC Two Tier, 1 AC Two Tier, 5 AC Three Tier, 12 Sleeper class, 2 General Unreserved,2 Luggage Cum Disabled Coaches and 1 Pantry Car.

Schedule
This bi-weekly service leaves Tiruchirappalli Junction as 12664, arrives , reverses the loco and finally reaches the destination at Howrah.

See also
 Cholan Express
 Pallavan Express
 Rockfort Express
 Tiruchirappalli–Mayiladuthurai Express
 Vaigai Superfast Express
 Tiruchirappalli–Thiruvananthapuram Intercity Express

Notes

References

External links
 Southern Railway - Official Website

Railway services introduced in 1998
Rail transport in Tamil Nadu
Rail transport in West Bengal
Rail transport in Andhra Pradesh
Rail transport in Odisha
Express trains in India
Rail transport in Howrah
Rail transport in Tiruchirappalli